Daniel "Dani" Pérez Guerrero (born 26 July 2005) is a Spanish professional footballer who plays as a midfielder for Betis Deportivo Balompié.

Professional career
Pérez is a youth product of Real Betis, and worked his way up their youth sides before being promoted to their reserves in 2022. On 5 October 2022, he signed a professional contract with Betis until 2025 and started training with their senior squad. He made his senior and professional debut with Real Betis as a late substitute in a 3–0 UEFA Europa League win over HJK Helsinki on 3 November 2022.

International career
Pérez is a youth international for Spain, having played up to the Spain U18s.

Personal life
Pérez is the cousin of the Olympic gymnast Ana Pérez.

References

External links
 
 
 

2005 births
Living people
Footballers from Seville
Spanish footballers
Spain youth international footballers
Association football midfielders
Real Betis players
Betis Deportivo Balompié footballers
Segunda Federación players